Swapname Ninakku Nandi is a 1983 Indian Malayalam film, directed by Kallayam Krishnadas. The film stars Jayabharathi, Sukumaran and Bahadoor in the lead roles. The film has musical score by G. Devarajan.

Cast
Jayabharathi as Nabisa
Sukumaran as Madhavankutty
Bahadoor as Bakker
KPAC Sunny as Johny
Poojappura Ravi as Pachu Pilla
Lalithasree as Kaduthi Ponnamma
Kunchan as Mallan
Alummoodan as Broker Gopalan
Ravi Menon as Mammukka/Appu
Archita as Rasiya

Soundtrack
The music was composed by G. Devarajan and the lyrics were written by Kallayam Krishnadas and Chunakkara Ramankutty.

References

External links

See the film
 swapname ninakku nandi

1983 films
1980s Malayalam-language films